"Il me reste un pays" ("There is still a country for me") is a song written by Gilles Vigneault, a Quebec francophone, and Gaston Rochon.

References 

Quebecois patriotic songs
Gilles Vigneault songs
Songs written by Gilles Vigneault